The First Presbyterian Church of Hollywood has had a significant impact on both the Presbyterian Church and evangelical Christianity around the world.

The church was founded in 1903. A large brick gothic sanctuary was built in 1923, and seats 1,800, with a balcony on both sides and in the back. The church campus covers a full square block on Gower Street, one block north of Hollywood Boulevard and three blocks from the legendary intersection of Hollywood and Vine.

History

1921–1941: Dr. Steward P. MacLennon 
Dr. Stewart P. MacLennon pastored the church from 1921–1941, and it was through his ministry that the sleepy Hollywood Church turned into a thriving mega-church in the 1920s, with its growth from 651 members in 1920 to 2370 members by 1930. A renowned preacher, he dreamed that it would be a center for Christian education and a "lighthouse" for the Word of God. In 1927 he met Henrietta Mears in Minneapolis and invited her to come and be a full-time Christian Education Director at the church. From 1928-1941 they worked together as a ministry team—his preaching and her teaching—developing a nationally known ministry. When he left, the Church called Dr. Louis H. Evans Sr. to be their pastor.

1941–1953: Dr. Louis H. Evans 
Dr. Henrietta Mears served as the Christian Education Director from 1928 until her death in 1963. She became famous for growing the Sunday school from 400 to over 4000 in the first two-and-a-half years of ministry at the church. The Sunday school curriculum she created became the foundation for Gospel Light Press. Mears also founded the Forest Home Christian Conference Center in the San Bernardino Mountains. Though perhaps most significantly, Mears is remembered for mentoring over 400 men and women into full-time ministry, including: Richard C. Halverson, F. Dale Bruner, Darrell Guder, Donn Moomaw, Louis Evans Jr., Colleen Townsend Evans, Margaret Kerry, Bill Bright, and she encouraged and counseled Billy Graham.

“Hollywood Pres,” as it is informally known, grew to be the largest Presbyterian Church in the world during the tenure of Dr. Evans and Dr. Lindqust (below).

Dr. Louis H. Evans was senior pastor from 1941 to 1953, during which time the membership grew from 1,400 to its peak of 8,900, according to the church's website. Evans left to become “Minister at Large” for the Presbyterian Board of National Missions.

1953–1971: Dr. Raymond I. Lindquist 
Dr. Evans was succeeded by Dr. Raymond I. Lindquist, who served the church until 1971. After declining somewhat, membership was restored to 8,388. During these years, the church drew congregants from an area much larger than the Hollywood community, taking advantage of its access to the Los Angeles freeway system (the church is located one block south of the Gower Street exit from the Hollywood Freeway). In Dr. Lindquist's tenure, overflow congregations were the norm, with the sanctuary filled for Sunday morning services at 9:30 and 11:00. In the early 1960s, overflow congregations were served in the church gymnasium (the pre-1923 sanctuary) by closed-circuit television. Dr. Lindquist died in 2001.

1971–1997: Dr. Lloyd John Ogilvie 
Dr. Lloyd John Ogilvie became Senior Pastor in 1972. Dr. Ogilvie's ministry extended beyond the physical doors of the church through his successful nationwide televised ministry.  His ministry was also of a significant impact to those in the entertainment industry.  Dr. Ogilvie left in March 11, 1995 to become Chaplain of the United States Senate. Ogilvie was the second former Hollywood Presbyterian minister to serve in that capacity. Dr. Richard C. Halverson, who was pastor of 4th Presbyterian Church in Bethesda, Maryland (a Washington, DC suburb) served as Senate chaplain immediately before Dr. Ogilvie (1981–1994). Halverson had served as an assistant pastor at “Hollywood Pres” in the 1950s. Ogilvie served as Senate chaplain until 2003.

1997–2005: Dr. Alan Meenan 
Dr. Ogilvie was followed by Dr. Alan Meenan in 1997. A beguiling Irishman, Dr. Meenan served the church for eight years.  Four different Sunday morning services were instituted to reflect contemplative, classic, and contemporary worship styles. In 2005, Dr. Meenan was placed on leave by the PCUSA. Subsequently, FPCH dissolved its relationship with Meenan in 2005.

2005–2010: Interim Period 
The church in Hollywood entered a period of upheaval after dissolving its relationship with Dr. Meenan.  Two new congregations broke off from FPCH during this time. Ecclesia Church in Hollywood grew out of one of FPCH's contemporary services while Church for the Nations met in Glendale, California (under Dr. Meenan). The ministry of FPCH continued with Dr. Gary Stratman serving as interim pastor, who brought significant healing to FPCH during this season of upheaval until 2009 when the duties of a dual interim pastorship were filled by Dr. Paul Pierson  & Rev. Bill Hansen.

2010–2019: Rev. Daniel Baumgartner 
In 2010 Rev. Daniel Baumgartner became the new senior pastor.  Commonly referred to as 'Pastor Dan', he previously served as pastor in Seattle and Minneapolis. Pastor Dan was seen by many as the "people's pastor" for his accessible style and warm demeanor. Although FPCH suffered a significant loss in membership following Pastor Meenan's time at FPCH, the interim period brought healing to a divided congregation. The Rev. Baumgartner continued this restorative work until his departure in 2019.

Hollywood Presbyterian has historically been an evangelical church in a liberal Christian denomination. In May 2013, the Session of Hollywood Presbyterian Church voted to affiliate with the Fellowship of Presbyterians, an evangelical group of churches within the PCUSA.

2019–2021: Interim Period 
After the Rev. Baumgartner's departure in 2019, the church called Dr. Tim Eichler as the interim pastor. FPCH entered a period of significant decline and staff loss under the leadership of the Session and Dr. Tim Eichler from 2020 to 2021, a decline that was exacerbated by the COVID pandemic.

See also
Presbyterian Church (USA)

References

External links

Presbyterian churches in California
Churches in Los Angeles
Evangelical churches in California
Buildings and structures in Hollywood, Los Angeles
Churches completed in 1923